The Scarlet Letter is an 1850 novel by Nathaniel Hawthorne (and the eponymous scarlet "A" mentioned therein).

Scarlet Letter or Scarlet Letters may also refer to:

Music
 The Scarlet Letter (Damrosch opera), 1896 opera based on the novel, composed by Walter Damrosch
 The Scarlet Letter (Kroll opera), 1965 opera based on the novel, composed by Fredric Kroll
 The Scarlet Letter (Laitman opera), 2008 opera based on the novel, composed by Lori Laitman
 "Scarlet Letters" (song), 2009 song by Mudvayne
 The Scarlet Letter (album)
 The Scarlet Letter (musical), 2001 musical, based on the novel, with lyrics & music by Stacey Mancine & Daniel Koloski; additional lyrics, music & orchestrations by Simon Gray; and book by Michael Bahar & Eric Braverman

Film and television
 The Scarlet Letter (1908 film), starring Gene Gauntier and Jack Conway
 The Scarlet Letter (1911 film), American film starring Lucille Young and King Baggot
 The Scarlet Letter (1913 film), American film starring Linda Arvidson and Murdock MacQuarrie
 The Scarlet Letter (1917 film), starring Mary Martin and Stuart Holmes
 The Scarlet Letter (1920 film), produced by Selznick Pictures Corporation
 The Scarlet Letter (1922 film), British film starring Sybil Thorndike and Tony Fraser
 The Scarlet Letter (1926 film), American film starring Lillian Gish and Lars Hanson
 The Scarlet Letter (1934 film), American film starring Colleen Moore and Hardie Albright
 The Scarlet Letter (1973 film), German film starring Senta Berger and Hans Christian Blech
 The Scarlet Letter (TV miniseries), a 1979 miniseries starring Meg Foster, Kevin Conway, and John Heard
 The Scarlet Letter (1995 film), American film starring Demi Moore, Gary Oldman, and Robert Duvall
 The Scarlet Letter (2004 film), South Korean mystery/thriller starring Han Suk-kyu, Lee Eun-ju, and Sung Hyun-ah
 The Scarlet Letter (2015 film), film directed by Elizabeth Berry starring Molly Wilson, Kevin Wegner, John Risner

Other uses 
 The Scarlet Letters, 1953 novel by Ellery Queen